Bardenhewer is a German surname. Notable people with the surname include:

 Otto Bardenhewer (1851–1935), German Catholic patrologist
 Werner Bardenhewer (1929–2019), German Catholic priest

German-language surnames